The 2018 MAAC women's soccer tournament was the postseason women's soccer tournament for the Metro Atlantic Athletic Conference held from October 29 through November 4, 2018. The five-match tournament took place at campus sites.  The host for the matches was determined by seeding from regular season play.  The six-team single-elimination tournament consisted of three rounds based on seeding from regular season conference play. The Monmouth Hawks were the defending champions and successfully defended their title.

Bracket

Source:

Schedule

First Round

Semi-finals

Final

Statistics

Goalscorers 
3 Goals
 Emily McNelis - Siena

2 Goals
 Madie Gibson - Monmouth
 Annie Ibey - Niagara
 Jazlyn Moya - Monmouth
 Jesi Rossman - Monmouth

1 Goal
 Jill Conklin - Monmouth
 Kourtney Cunningham - Rider
 Darby D'Angelo - Siena
 Alli DeLuca - Monmouth
 Kelsey Goldring - Quinnipiac
 Alexis Marino - Monmouth
 Lexie Pallandino - Monmouth
 Meghan Riccardi - Siena

All-Tournament team
Source:

See also 
 2018 MAAC Men's Soccer Tournament

References 

 
Metro Atlantic Athletic Conference Women's Soccer Tournament